Leschenaultia is a genus of flies in the family Tachinidae. It may be synonymous with the genus Harrisia, but the type material of Harrisia has been lost, hindering comparisons. Leschenaultia comprises 32 species, distributed across the Americas:

Species
L. adusta (Loew, 1872) – United States (California, Arizona, New Mexico), Mexico (Sonora, Durango)
L. aldrichi Toma & Guimarães, 2002 – Brazil (São Paulo, Santa Catarina)
L. americana (Brauer & von Bergenstamm, 1893) – Canada (British Columbia, Alberta), United States (Oregon, Montana, Idaho, California, Arizona)
L. arnaudi Toma & Guimarães, 2002 – Haiti
L. barbarae Toma, 2008 – Venezuela
L. bergenstammi Toma & Guimarães, 2002 – Brazil (Santa Catarina), Peru (San Martín)
L. bessi Toma & Guimarães, 2002 – Brazil (São Paulo, Santa Catarina)
L. bicolor (Macquart, 1846) – Canada, United States, Mexico, Brazil, Argentina
L. bigoti Toma & Guimarães, 2002 – Mexico, Honduras, Costa Rica, Ecuador, Peru, Brazil
L. blanchardi Toma & Guimarães, 2002 – Ecuador
L. braueri Toma & Guimarães, 2002 – Mexico, Venezuela, Brazil
L. brooksi Toma & Guimarães, 2002 – Mexico, Panama, Peru, Brazil
L. ciliata (Macquart, 1848) – Colombia (Bogotá)
L. coquilletti Toma & Guimarães, 2002 – Brazil (Santa Catarina)
L. cortesi Toma & Guimarães, 2002 – Venezuela, Colombia
L. currani Toma & Guimarães, 2002 – Brazil (São Paulo, Santa Catarina)
L. exul (Townsend, 1892) – Canada (Ontario, Quebec, New Brunswick), United States (Maine, New York, New Hampshire, Massachusetts, Connecticut, New Jersey, Maryland)
L. fulvipes (Bigot, 1887) – Canada (British Columbia, Saskatchewan), United States (Washington, Idaho, Wyoming, California, Arizona, New Mexico, Texas)
L. grossa Brooks, 1947 – United States (Nevada, Arizona, New Mexico)
L. halisidotae Brooks, 1947 – Canada (British Columbia, Ontario, Quebec), United States (Minnesota, Maine, New York, Massachusetts, Ohio, Wisconsin, Pennsylvania, New Jersey, California, Arizona)
L. hospita Reinhard, 1952 – Mexico (Michoacán, Oaxaca, Morelos), United States (New Mexico)
L. hystrix (Townsend, 1915) – Peru (Matucana)
L. jurinioides (Townsend, 1895) – Jamaica
L. leucophrys (Wiedemann, 1830) – Mexico, Venezuela, Ecuador, Bolivia, Peru, Paraguay, Uruguay, Brazil
L. loewi Toma & Guimarães, 2002 – Mexico (Veracruz)
L. macquarti Toma & Guimarães, 2002 – United States (Arizona)
L. montagna (Townsend, 1912) – Peru
L. nuda Thompson, 1963 – Trinidad
L. reinhardi Toma & Guimarães, 2002 – Canada (British Columbia, Ontario, Quebec), United States (Oregon, Idaho, Ohio, California, Tennessee)
L. sabroskyi Toma & Guimarães, 2002 – United States (California, Arizona)
L. schineri Toma & Guimarães, 2002 – United States (Oregon, California, Idaho)
L. thompsoni Toma & Guimarães, 2002 – Mexico (Mexico City, Chiapas)
L. townsendi Toma & Guimarães, 2002 – Mexico (Puebla)

One species, L. nigrisquamis (Townsend, 1892), was not examined in the most recent monograph of the genus, because the type material is missing, and two former species were not recognised:
L. trichopsis (Bigot, 1887)
L. hirta Robineau-Desvoidy, 1830

References

Exoristinae
Diptera of North America
Diptera of South America
Tachinidae genera
Taxa named by Jean-Baptiste Robineau-Desvoidy